Thoressa sitala, the Tamil ace or Sitala ace, is a butterfly belonging to the family Hesperiidae found in south India.<

Description

Life cycle

References

External links

s
Butterflies of Asia